Reginald DeSean Davis (born September 3, 1976) is a former American football tight end and current running backs coach for the Arlington Renegades of the XFL. He was signed by the San Diego Chargers as an undrafted free agent in 1999. He played college football at Washington.

Davis was hired by the University of Nebraska on January 2, 2015.

On January 11, 2020, Davis was hired by the St. Louis BattleHawks to be their running backs coach.

Davis was officially hired by the Arlington Renegades on September 13, 2022

References

External links
San Francisco 49ers bio
Oregon State Beavers bio
UNLV Rebels bio
San Diego Toreros bio

1976 births
Living people
American football tight ends
Nebraska Cornhuskers football coaches
Oregon State Beavers football coaches
San Diego Chargers players
San Diego Toreros football coaches
San Francisco 49ers coaches
St. Louis BattleHawks coaches
UNLV Rebels football coaches
Washington Huskies football players